Agape, Chionia and Irene were sisters and Christian saints from Aquileia, martyred at Thessalonica in 304 AD. Agape and Chionia were charged with refusing to eat sacrificial offerings, whilst Irene was killed for keeping Christian books in violation of existing law. All were condemned to be burned alive.

Legend
Orphaned at a young age, the sisters Agape, Chionia, and Irene led pious lives under the direction of the priest Xeno. They declined a number of offers of marriage. In 303, Emperor Diocletian issued a decree making it a capital offense to possess Christian scriptures. The sisters hid their copies.

Eventually, they were arrested for offending the Imperial cult by not eating food that had been sacrificed to the gods. They were brought before Emperor Diocletian, who could not persuade them to renounce their faith, and as he was leaving for Macedonia, brought them with him. There they were taken to the court of Dulcitius, governor of Thessalonica.

The sisters repulsed the governor's indecent advances. Annoyed with Dulcititus as ineffectual, Diocletian turned the three young women over to Count Sisinus for trial. He imprisoned Irene, the youngest; and making no headway in getting the older two to recant, ordered them to be burned. Afterwards the decedents appeared to be merely asleep as neither their clothes nor bodies had been scorched. After the deaths, their house was searched and the scriptures found and publicly burned.

Sisinus ordered Irene to be taken to a brothel, but on the way the escort was intercepted by two soldiers who told them to abandon her on a mountain. When they returned Sisinus grew angry as he had given no such orders. He pursued Irene and she was wounded in the throat with an arrow, at which point she died. 

Four other individuals were tried with the sisters: Agatho, Casia, Philippa and Eutychia. Of these, one woman was remanded as she was pregnant. The fates of the other three are unknown.

Legacy
The story of their martyrdom is the subject of a 10th-century medieval Latin drama by the secular canoness, Hrotsvitha of Gandersheim. 

The island of Santorini is named after a cathedral established honoring Irene in the island village of Perissa.

References

Sources
Attwater, Donald & John, Catherine Rachel. The Penguin Dictionary of Saints. 3rd edition. New York: Penguin Books, 1993. .
  (Includes the complete English translation of the ancient Acts of Agape, Chionia and Irene)
Full online text of Hrotsvitha's play, Dulcitius, Fordham University.

304 deaths
People executed by burning
Groups of Christian martyrs of the Roman era
Saints of Roman Thessalonica
4th-century Christian saints
4th-century Christian martyrs
Christian hagiography
Late Ancient Christian female saints
Christians martyred during the reign of Diocletian
Sibling trios